Kinrooi is a municipality in the Belgian province of Limburg, between Maaseik and Bree. On January 1, 2006, Kinrooi had a total population of 11,978. The total area is 54.76 km², which gives a population density of 219 inhabitants per km².

Kinrooi was formed on September 18, 1971, when the four municipalities Kinrooi, Kessenich, Geistingen-Ophoven and Molenbeersel were fused. There have been three mayors. The current mayor is Jo Brouns.

History
Before, Kinrooi was a hamlet of the village of Kessenich. The flag reminds to that; the clarions stood on the shield of Kessenich. After the independence of Belgium in 1839 it became a little municipality, together with some nearby hamlets. In 2005 there are prehistoric remains found in the center, when it was being renovated.

Economy

Kinrooi's main economic activities are agriculture, tourism and the reclamation of gravel, sand and loam.
The downside of this reclamation is that a lot of land surface gets lost. Tourism is also an important resource. Kinrooi attracts a lot of tourists because it has seven nature reserves that harbor rare animal and plant species, it has a marina and because it has several old windmills. Besides, there is a lot of watersporting, in the old gravel pools. One of them, lying in Ophoven, is now the greatest inner harbour of Europe.

Places of interest
 The , a windmill built in 1856
 , a neogotical church built in 1853

References

External links
 
  

 
Municipalities of Limburg (Belgium)